Darling Range is an electoral district of the Legislative Assembly in the Australian state of Western Australia.

The district is based to the east and south-east of Perth.

Geography
Darling Range is situated in the outer east and south-east of Perth. It is a mixture of suburbia and hinterland, falling inside the Metropolitan Region Scheme and running along most of its southern and eastern boundary. The district covers all of the Shire of Serpentine-Jarrahdale as well as the less urbanised parts of the city of Armadale.

History
Darling Range was first created for the 1950 state election. The seat's first member was Country MP Ray Owen, who was previously the member for Swan. The district was abolished ahead of the 1974 state election. By this time its member was Liberal MP Ian Thompson, who went on to represent the new district of Kalamunda. Darling Range was recreated one term later for the 1977 state election.

The seat was radically redistributed ahead of the 2008 state election, with 15% of the voters in the redrawn district coming from its former configuration. Half of the district's voters—and indeed the vast majority of its territory—previously belonged to the abolished district of Serpentine-Jarrahdale, with the remainder coming from Armadale and Swan Hills. Thus, sitting Serpentine-Jarrahdale member, Liberal MP Tony Simpson became the new member for Darling Range at the 2008 election, whilst the former member for Darling Range, Liberal MP John Day, successfully contested the new seat of Kalamunda.

Simpson served as the MP for Darling Range until his defeat by Barry Urban at the 2017 state election. This result marked the first time that the Labor Party had ever won the seat. In May 2018, Urban resigned from parliament as the privileges committee recommended his expulsion over a series of false claims of his credentials. At the subsequent by-election former East Metropolitan MLC Alyssa Hayden recovered the seat for the Liberals. Hayden was defeated by Labor candidate Hugh Jones at the 2021 election, marking the second time Labor had won the seat.

Members for Darling Range

Election results

References

External links
 ABC election profiles: 2005 2008 2013 2017
 WAEC district maps: current boundaries, previous distributions

Darling Range